John Wesley Harding's New Deal is an album by the folk-rock singer-songwriter John Wesley Harding, released on February 13, 1996, on Forward Records, an imprint of Rhino Records focused on releasing albums by new artists.

Track listing

Personnel
John Wesley Harding -	guitar, 12-string guitar, acoustic guitar, harmonica, Hammond organ, percussion, typewriter, vocals, backing vocals, arrangements
Bennet Bowman - drums
Greg Leisz -acoustic guitar, electric guitar, Steel guitar, bass guitar
Robert Lloyd -	accordion, Farfisa organ, mandolin, Hammond organ, piano
David Phillips - pedal steel
Tammy Rogers -	cello, violin
Denise Stace -	bells
Harry Stinson -	engineer
Peter Straus -	bass
Geoff Sykes -	mastering
Chris Von Sneidern - bass, drums, engineer, mixing, percussion, producer, tambourine, backing vocals, arrangements

References

1996 albums
Rhino Records albums
John Wesley Harding (singer) albums